Rimlan-e Kamal (also Romanized as Rīmlān-e Kamāl; also known as Moḩammad Kamāl and Rīmdān Kamāl) is a village in Sand-e Mir Suiyan Rural District, Dashtiari District, Chabahar County, Sistan and Baluchestan Province, Iran. At the 2006 census, its population was 162, in 37 families.

References 

Populated places in Chabahar County